Acanthosaura liui is a species of agama found in China.

References

liui
Reptiles of China
Reptiles described in 2020